Gratiot Township was a civil township of Wayne County in the U.S. state of Michigan.  Located in the northeast corner of the county, the township's eastern and southern border was with Grosse Pointe Township along Mack Road (now Mack Avenue).  The northern border was the Macomb County line, and the western border was with Hamtramck Township.

History

The area that would become Gratiot Township was originally organized as part of Hamtramck Township, which was created by the state legislature in 1827.  The eastern section of the township of Hamtramck was then split off and reorganized as Grosse Pointe Township in 1848.  Gratiot Township came into existence when the northwestern part of Grosse Pointe Township was split off and organized by the Board of Supervisors of Wayne County in May 1895.

Gratiot Township had a relatively short existence.  Detroit had already begun annexing land in the township soon after its creation, as well as those of neighboring Grosse Pointe and Hamtramck.  During this same period, the communities in Grosse Pointe Township had begun to incorporate as villages or cities to further protect themselves from the encroachment of Detroit.  By 1926, Detroit reached its greatest extent leaving Gratiot Township's western border at Kelly Road and its southern border at Kingsville Avenue.  The township ceased to exist in 1951 when its entire area was incorporated as the city of Harper Woods in anticipation of the construction of Eastland Center in the northwestern corner of the township.

See also
Grosse Pointe Township
Greenfield Township
Hamtramck Township

References

Defunct townships in Michigan
Former townships in Wayne County, Michigan
1827 establishments in Michigan Territory
Populated places established in 1827
1951 disestablishments in Michigan
Populated places disestablished in 1951